The 2000 African Women's Handball Championship was the 14th edition of the African Women's Handball Championship, held in Algeria from 23 April to 1 May 2000. It acted as the African qualifying tournament for the 2001 World Women's Handball Championship.

Preliminary round
All times are local (UTC+1).

Group A

Group B

Knockout stage

Bracket

Semifinals

Seventh place game

Fifth place game

Third place game

Final

Final ranking

External links
Results on todor66.com

2000 Women
African Women's Handball Championship
African Women's Handball Championship
2000 in Algerian sport
2000 in African handball
April 2000 sports events in Africa
May 2000 sports events in Africa
Women's handball in Algeria
2000 in African women's sport